Andrea Matteo Acquaviva d'Aragona (died 1576) was a Roman Catholic prelate who served as Archbishop of Cosenza (1573–1576) and Bishop of Venafro (1558–1573).

Biography
On 20 July 1558, Andrea Matteo Acquaviva d'Aragona was appointed during the papacy of Pope Paul IV as Bishop of Venafro. On 16 September 1573, he was appointed during the papacy of Pope Gregory XIII as Archbishop of Cosenza. He served as Archbishop of Cosenza until his death in 1576. While bishop, he was the principal co-consecrator of Beatus di Porta, Bishop of Chur (1565).

References 

Gennaro Morra, Un vescovo riformatore di Venafro. Andrea Matteo Acquaviva d'Aragona, 1558–1573, in "Campania Sacra: studi e documenti", 13-14 (1982-1983), pagg. 107-148

External links and additional sources
 (for Chronology of Bishops) 
 (for Chronology of Bishops)  
 (for Chronology of Bishops) 
 (for Chronology of Bishops) 

16th-century Italian Roman Catholic bishops
Bishops appointed by Pope Paul IV
Bishops appointed by Pope Gregory XIII
1576 deaths